Götrik Wilhelm Adolf "Putte" Frykman (1 December 1891 – 7 April 1944) was a Swedish bandy player and football player who competed in the 1912 Summer Olympics.

Frykman was part of the Djurgården side that won the Swedish football championship in 1912 and 1915. He also won the Swedish bandy championship in 1908 and 1912 with Djurgården.

He was a member of the Swedish Olympic squad in 1912. He played as a midfielder in one match at the consolation tournament.

Honours

Football
Djurgårdens IF 
 Svenska Mästerskapet: 1912, 1915

Bandy
Djurgårdens IF
 Svenska Mästerskapet: 1908, 1912

References

1891 births
1944 deaths
Swedish bandy players
Association football midfielders
Swedish footballers
Sweden international footballers
Djurgårdens IF Fotboll players
Olympic footballers of Sweden
Footballers at the 1912 Summer Olympics
Djurgårdens IF Bandy players